Anna-Caren Sätherberg (born 5 October 1964) is a Swedish politician. Since 30 November 2021, she serves as minister for rural affairs in Magdalena Andersson's Cabinet. Previously, she served as member of the Riksdag since 29 September 2014, representing the constituency of Jämtland County.

References 

Living people
1964 births
Place of birth missing (living people)
21st-century Swedish politicians
21st-century Swedish women politicians
Members of the Riksdag 2014–2018
Members of the Riksdag 2018–2022
Members of the Riksdag 2022–2026
Members of the Riksdag from the Social Democrats
Women members of the Riksdag
Swedish Ministers for Agriculture
Women government ministers of Sweden